Olpidium brassicae is a plant pathogen, it is a fungal obligate parasite. In 1983, the Alsike, Alberta area's clover (which is a major part of horses' diet) was struck by a fungus epidemic of Olpidium brassicae, previously not seen in Canada.

Vector 
O. brassicae is the fungal vector for most, if not all, necroviruses.

References

External links 
 Index Fungorum
 USDA ARS Fungal Database

Fungal plant pathogens and diseases
Plant pathogens and diseases by vector
Chytridiomycota
Fungi described in 1878